John Kenneth Foster (29 May 1866 – 2 March 1930) was a British Conservative Party politician.

He was MP for Coventry in 1910.  Like a few Conservatives, he took the seat in the first general election of January that year, but lost it in December 1910.

References 

1866 births
1930 deaths
Conservative Party (UK) MPs for English constituencies
Members of the Parliament of the United Kingdom for Coventry
UK MPs 1910